Bishop of North Queensland may refer to:

 Anglican Bishop of North Queensland
 Roman Catholic Bishop of Townsville, North Queensland
 Roman Catholic Bishop of Cairns, Far North Queensland